Bukit Bunga is a village in Tanah Merah District, Kelantan, Malaysia. It is located at the Malaysia-Thailand border and is the latest border crossing between Malaysia and Thailand with the opening of the Bukit Bunga-Ban Buketa Bridge on December 21, 2007.

Across the border is the Thai town of Ban Buketa in Amphoe Waeng, Narathiwat Province.

Bukit Bunga is 30 km from Tanah Merah along East-West Highway. It's made up of several smaller kampungs, amongst them are Bukit Nangka, Cedok, Tokpe, Kampung Bukit, Renab, Jenub. Where the hub is revolved around the Bukit Bunga mosque.

Bukit Bunga has in the past few decades become one of the main entry points to Thailand from Malaysia. It had its own police station in 1981, and it also has a school, a customs department and an immigration department. Lately, it has become a hub for local tourists in search of Thai goods.

References

Malaysia–Thailand border crossings
Tanah Merah District
Villages in Kelantan